Greuteria is a genus of flowering plants belonging to the family Fabaceae.

Its native range is Northwestern Africa.

Species:

Greuteria argyrea 
Greuteria membranacea

References

Hedysareae
Fabaceae genera